The Adjutant General of South Carolina is head of the South Carolina Military Department, overseeing the South Carolina National Guard, the South Carolina State Guard and the South Carolina Emergency Management Division. The Adjutant General is the highest-ranking uniformed officer in the state, subordinate to the Governor who serves as Commander-in-Chief of the South Carolina National Guard.

The office was the only adjutant general in the nation that was an elected position. Adjutants General were elected for four-year terms at the same times as the Governor and other officials. This changed after the 2014 elections because South Carolina voters approved Amendment 2 in the 2014 general election, that will be the last time that the adjutant general is popularly elected. That was the final time that a state adjutant general will stand for election in the United States, barring future state constitutional changes.

A famous former Adjutant General is James C. Dozier, who held the post from 1926 to 1959. Edwin Warren Moïse served as Adjutant and Inspector General from 1876 to 1880.

The Current AG is Major General Van McCarty. He was appointed to the position on January 17, 2019 by Governor Henry McMaster following the retirement of Major General Robert Livingston. MG McCarty had previously served as Assistant Adjutant General, Army.

References

External links
South Carolina Office of the Adjutant General
South Carolina National Guard
South Carolina Emergency Management Division
South Carolina State Guard

Adjutant General
Adjutant General
Adjutants general of the National Guard of the United States